Dongfeng Motor Company Limited (abb. DFL), most commonly known in English-language sources as Dongfeng Nissan, is a Chinese automobile manufacturing company headquartered in Wuhan, Hubei. It is a 50–50 joint-venture between Dongfeng Motor Group and Nissan Motors. It produces passenger cars under the Nissan marque and commercial vehicles under the Dongfeng marque.

Name
Dongfeng Motor Corporation ( and previously ) is a separate legal entity from Dongfeng Motor Co., Ltd.. Dongfeng Motor Corporation is a Chinese, state-owned automaker while Dongfeng Motor Co., Ltd. is a joint venture between Dongfeng Motor Group and Nissan. Dongfeng Motor Co., Ltd. had a subsidiary Dongfeng Automobile Co., Ltd. (DFAC) which also had a similar name with Dongfeng Motor Co., Ltd..

, according to Reuters, about 68% of Dongfeng Motor Group products were connected to Nissan, and, as of 2006, the company was being referred to as "the biggest Sino-foreign vehicle joint venture". According to Dongfeng Motor Group, Dongfeng Motor Co., Ltd. (DFL) and it subsidiaries produced 1,501,562 units of vehicles in year 2017, out of Dongfeng Motor Group's 3,306,086 units from all its divisions, subsidiaries and joint ventures, or 45% production volume of the listed portion of the whole Dongfeng Motor Corporation group. This figure did not distinguish licensed model from the production volume, but by legal person basis.

History
Dongfeng Motor Co., Ltd. (DFL) was formally established on 9 June 2003 and began operations on 1 July 2003. Initially headquartered in Shiyan, it moved closer to its Chinese parent relocating to Wuhan in June, 2006.

Sales targets in 2007 were in excess of 600,000 units.

In September 2010, DFL unveiled a new automobile marque, Venucia, to sell vehicles tailored specifically for second- and third-tier Chinese cities in the poorer interior of the country.

In 2011, a roadmap for additional investment in Dongfeng Motor Co., Ltd. by its Japanese and Chinese parents was drawn up as part of a plan to boost annual sales from around 1.3 million vehicles in 2010 to over 2.3 million by 2015. In April 2012, it was announced that Dongfeng Motor Co., Ltd. would begin manufacturing models from the range of Nissan's luxury marque, Infiniti, beginning in 2014.

Production bases and facilities
As of 2006, the company reportedly had factories in Hubei, Guangdong, the Guangxi Zhuang Autonomous Region, the Xinjiang Uygur Autonomous Region, and Zhejiang.

As of 2015, a subsidiary, Dongfeng Nissan Passenger Vehicle Company, is listed as having a R&D center as well as a variety of factories including sites in: Dalian, Huadu, Xiangyang, and Zhengzhou. The Dalian location may be the same site that was in the planning stages as of 2012 and slated to produce Nissan-branded automobiles.

A corporate campus and design center in Huadu, Guangzhou, was announced in 2017.

Subsidiaries
, DFL had the following subsidiaries:

 Dongfeng Automobile Company (60.1%)
 Dongfeng Nissan Passenger Vehicle Company
 Zhengzhou Nissan Automobile Company
 Dongfeng Infiniti Motor Company
 Dongfeng Motor Parts and Components Group Company

Products

After the majority stake of Zhengzhou Nissan, was acquired by Dongfeng Motor Co., Ltd., there are three brands of products sold under the firm, including Dongfeng, Fengdu, and Nissan.

Dongfeng products
Dongfeng Rich
Dongfeng Rich
Dongfeng Rich EV
Dongfeng Rich SUV
Dongfeng Rich 6
Dongfeng Succe
Dongfeng Succe
Dongfeng Succe EV
Dongfeng Succe EV panelvan
Dongfeng Yufeng S16
Dongfeng Yufeng P16
Dongfeng Junfeng
Dongfeng Oting (discontinued)

Dongfeng Ruitaite products
Electric commercial van products.
Dongfeng Ruitaite EM10
Dongfeng Ruitaite EM16
Dongfeng Ruitaite EM30

Fengdu products
Fengdu MX5
Fengdu MX6

Nissan products
Nissan NV200
Nissan Navara
Nissan Terra

Footnotes

References

External links

 

Car manufacturers of China
Nissan
Dongfeng Motor joint ventures